The Tom Byrne House, in Lincoln County, Idaho near Shoshone, Idaho was built in 1914 and was listed on the National Register of Historic Places in 1983.

It is a one-story lava rock house built by the Hayden brothers, and has some elements of Colonial Revival style.

It is located northeast of Shoshone.

References

		
National Register of Historic Places in Lincoln County, Idaho
Colonial Revival architecture in Idaho
Residential buildings completed in 1914
Lava rock buildings and structures